Halat Bu Maher, sometimes abbreviated to simply "Al Hala", is a neighbourhood of Muharraq, Bahrain. It used to be a separate island, but after coastal expansion and dredging, the island has merged with Muharraq Island, and the former settlement was integrated as a neighbourhood of Muharraq city.

Located at the southern tip of Muharraq city, the neighborhood is home to the historic Bu Maher Fort, which is part of the UNESCO-listed Bahrain Pearling Trail. The Al Hala Club football team is based here.

In the early 20th century, Halat Bu Maher was used as a quarantine camp for arrivals to Bahrain by sea or air.

References

Populated places in the Muharraq Governorate